Flesh is an American science fiction novel written by Philip José Farmer. Originally released in 1960, it was Farmer's second novel-length publication, after The Green Odyssey. Flesh features many sexual themes, as is typical of Farmer's earliest work.

Overview
In Flesh, Peter Stagg and a group of astronauts leave Earth in the twenty first century. Due to the benefits of hypersleep, they return to the planet eight hundred years later, in CE 2860. They find a strange world, inhabited by pagan cultists and bizarre societies decorating a scorched, rocky landscape, except for the mostly fertile eastern coast of the former United States and Karelians, European pirates from the remnants of Finland. Inducted into the mostly female "Elk" group, Stagg has antlers grafted onto his skull and is christened the "Sunhero". In that role, he becomes a sexual slave, forced to engage in intercourse with virtually every member of the group, especially virgins-although he balks at the "Pants-Elfs", a gay community from what was known as Pennsylvania in the twenty-second century. Society is dominated by goddess worshipping cults centred on the "Great White Mother" known as Columbia, as well as her adolescent daughter Virginia and the death-bringer crone goddess Alba.  The primary thrust of the book's plot is Stagg's internal dialogue, ruminating on the moral, ethical, spiritual, and physical implications of his actions. However, when he truly falls in love for the first time, the object of his affections refuses to give in to his physical advances. Ultimately, Stagg, his newfound lover Mary Casey, the remaining members of his crew and chosen female partners and children escape from the neopagan-dominated primitivist Earth once more, en route to an inhabitable planet in Vega's planetary system. However, a denouement suggests that this may have been intended by the elderly priestesses who control this matriarchal society.

Reaction and analysis
The book was met with a lukewarm reception by critics. While most enjoyed Farmer's writing style, they often felt that the plot was simply a weak excuse to string together lurid depictions of graphic sex. The revised and expanded edition published eight years after the original release was met with somewhat more praise, largely due to the perceived greater depth of the plot.

References
Flesh at Farmer's official website.
Reviews of Flesh at Farmer's official website.

Footnotes

External links 

1960 American novels
Novels by Philip José Farmer
Science fiction erotica
1960 science fiction novels